Operation Beit-ol-Moqaddas or Operation Toward Beit-ol-Moqaddas was an Iranian operation conducted during the Iran–Iraq War.  The operation was a success, as it achieved its standing aim of liberating Khorramshahr and pushed Iraqi troops back to the border.  This operation, coupled with Operation Tariq-ol-Qods, and Operation Fath-ol-Mobin, succeeded in evicting Iraqi troops from southern Iran and gave Iran the momentum.

Prelude

On 22 September 1980, because of his desire that Iraq should have complete dominance over the Shatt al-Arab (or the Arvand Rūd) waterway, Iraqi President Saddam Hussein declared war against Iran and launched a land invasion of southern Iran, although operations did occur elsewhere on the Iran–Iraq border.  After achieving successes due to the post-Revolution military and political chaos in Iran, Saddam Hussein ordered that the Iraqi troops "dig-in" on the front line.  He hoped that this would show the world that he cared about the fate of the Iranian people, and that he was only concerned with achieving his aim of securing the entire Shatt al-Arab waterway, which had been under dispute since the 1975 Algiers Agreement. However, since the Islamic Revolution of Iran in 1979, Iraq had felt that it was necessary to assume what it wanted through force, since previous attempts in getting the revolutionary Iranian government to negotiate a new settlement had proved fruitless.

Once the Iraqi forces had settled, the Iranians were planning a series of operations designed to evict the Iraqis from southern Iran, of which Operation Tariq al-Qods was one.

Battle

The Iranians attacked, with some 70,000 soldiers in the Ahvaz–Susangerd area.  The Iraqi forces in the area withdrew, and strengthened the defenses of Khorramshahr.

The Iraqis launched a counter-offensive on 20 May.  However, despite its scale, the Iranians were able to repulse the attack.

On 24 May, the Iranians liberated Khorramshahr; the vitally strategically and symbolically important Iranian city whose capture by Iraq had been the low-point of Iranian fortunes in the early days of the war

The Iraqis were ordered to retreat, although many had done so when Khorramshar had fallen, back into Iraq. The Iranians captured 15,000-19,000 Iraqi troops and a substantial amount of Iraqi military hardware in Khorramshahr.

The commander of the Iraqi forces in the city, Colonel Ahmad Zeidan, attempted to flee, but was trapped in a minefield which previously had been set up on his orders, and killed when he stepped on a mine.

Units

Iran

Iranian units involved in the operation were as follows: Each IRGC battalion was consisted of 300 Basij volunteers at most, while each Army battalion was around 2.5 times bigger. However, the number of battalions in each IRGC brigade was bigger than those of the Army.

Karbala Central Headquarters  Commanded by Mohsen Rezaei (IRGC commander) and Col. Ali Sayyad Shirazi (Army commander)
Fath Headquarters  Commanded by Gholam Ali Rashid and Col. Massoud Monfared Niyaki
IRGC:
3rd Fath Division
14th Imam Hossein Brigade (1st Fath)Commanded by Hossein Kharrazi
7 infantry battalions
8th Najaf Ashraf Brigade (3rd Fath)Commanded by Ahmad Kazemi
7 infantry battalions
25th Karbala Brigade (4th Fath)Commanded by Morteza Ghorbani
7 infantry battalions
Two battalions from 30th Armored Brigade
Army:
92nd Armored Division of Khuzestan
1st Brigade (1st Fath)
2nd Brigade (2nd Fath) (backup)
3rd Brigade (3rd Fath)
37th Armored Brigade of Shiraz (4th Fath)
55th Airborne Brigade of Shiraz (4th Fath)
151st Battalion (4th Fath)
8 artillery battalions
Combat engineering (Commanded by Col. Jalal Rajabi-Rad): 85 engineering vehicles overall (45 from Jihad of Construction, 22 from IRGC, 18 from Army)
Nasr Headquarters  Commanded by Hassan Baqeri and Col. Hossein Hassani Saadi
IRGC:
5th Nasr Division
7th Vali-e-Asr Brigade (1st Nasr)Commanded by Abdol-Mohammad Raoofi-Nezhad
27th Mohammad Rasulullah Brigade (2nd Nasr)Commanded by Ahmad Motevasselian
46th Fajr Brigade (3rd Nasr)
22nd Badr Brigade (5th Nasr)
One battalion from 30th Armored Brigade
Army:
21st Hamzeh Infantry Division of Azarbaijan
1st Brigade (1st Nasr)
2nd Brigade (2nd Nasr)
3rd Brigade (3rd Nasr)
4th Brigade (4th Nasr) (backup)
23rd Airborne Special Forces Brigade (Nowhed) (5th Nasr)
6 artillery battalions
Combat engineering: 48 engineering vehicles overall (27 from Jihad of Construction, 18 from IRGC, 3 from Army)
Qods Headquarters  Commanded by Ahmad Gholampoor and Col. Siroos Lotfi
IRGC:
1st Qods Division
31st Ashura Brigade (1st Qods)Commanded by Mehdi Bakeri
7 infantry battalions
21st Imam Reza Brigade (2nd Qods)
8 infantry battalions
37th Noor Brigade (3rd Qods)Commanded by Ali Hashemi
8 infantry battalions
41st Tharallah Brigade (4th Qods)Commanded by Qassem Soleimani
7 infantry battalions
43rd Beit-ol-Moqaddas Brigade (5th Qods)
8 infantry battalions
One tank battalion from 30th Armored Brigade
Army:
16th Armored Division of Qazvin
1st Brigade (1st Qods)
2 tank battalions, 2 mechanized battalions
2nd Brigade (2nd Qods)
2 tank battalions, 2 mechanized battalions
3rd Brigade (3rd Qods)
2 tank battalions, 1 mechanized battalion
58th Zolfaqar Commando Brigade of Shahroud (4th Qods)
4 infantry battalions, 1 tank battalion
254th Tank Battalion (5th Qods)
1 company
6 artillery battalions
Combat engineering: 59 engineering vehicles overall (23 from Jihad of Construction, 22 from IRGC, 14 from Army)
Fajr Headquarters (backup)
IRGC:
17th Ali ibn Abi Taleb Brigade
33rd Al-Mahdi Brigade
35th Imam Sajjad Brigade
Army:
77th Infantry Division of Khorasan
3rd Brigade

Combat engineer units involved were as follows:
Army: 63 engineering vehicles overall
Combat Engineer Battalion of 21st Division
Combat Engineer Battalion of 92nd Division
Combat Engineer Battalion of 16th Division
411th Combat Engineer Group of Borujerd
422nd Pontoon Bridge Group of Daghagheleh, Ahvaz
411th Pontoon Bridge Battalion
414th Combat Engineer Battalion
Zafar Company
IRGC: 60 engineering vehicles overall
Jihad of Construction: 100 engineering vehicles overall

Other forces included:
Islamic Republic of Iran Air Force: The IRIAF conducted 2,161 sorties overall. Air support duties were performed using 2 surface-to-surface missile bases together with F-4 Phantom II and F-14 Tomcat fighter jets. 20 sorties were conducted in the first day and 6 sorties in other days as close air support. 3 airbases were dedicated to medical evacuation duties, with 12-20 sorties per day.
Islamic Republic of Iran Army Aviation (Havanirooz): 96 helicopters were involved, including (sources differ on numbers): 24-26 Bell AH-1J International, 22-32 Bell 214, 6-16 Boeing CH-47C Chinook, 16-32 Bell 206 helicopters
Islamic Republic of Iran Navy's Takavar units
Islamic Republic of Iran Air Defense Force

Iraq
Iraqi units involved in the operation were as follows:
3rd Armored Division  Commanded by Brig. Gen. Jawad Asaad Shitnah
6th Armored Brigade
12th Armored Brigade  Commanded by Muhsin Abd al-Jalil
53rd Armored Brigade
8th Mechanized Brigade
6th Armored Division
16th Armored Brigade
30th Armored Brigade
25th Mechanized Brigade
7th Armored Division
9th Armored Division
35th Armored Brigade
43rd Armored Brigade
14th Mechanized Brigade
12th Armored Division
37th Armored Brigade
46th Mechanized Brigade
10th Armored Division
17th Armored Brigade
24th Mechanized Brigade
5th Mechanized Division
26th Armored Brigade
55th Armored Brigade
15th Mechanized Brigade
20th Mechanized Brigade
11th Infantry Division
44th Infantry Brigade
48th Infantry Brigade
49th Infantry Brigade
22nd Infantry Brigade
45th Infantry Brigade
113th Infantry Brigade
7th Infantry Division (I Corps)
19th Infantry Brigade
39th Infantry Brigade
15th Infantry Division
10th Independent Armored Brigade
31st, 32nd, 33rd, 416th, 417th, 601st, 602nd, 603rd, 119th Special Forces Brigades
Republican Guards:
10th Armored Brigade
109th, 419th, 416th, 90th, 417th, 601st, 602nd, 605th, 606th, 409th, 238th, & 501st Independent Infantry Brigades
9th, 10th, 20th, 113th Border Guard Brigades
33rd Special Forces Brigade
Thirty commando companies
Popular Army:
10 battalions (qati`), 450 fighters each
Saif Saad Independent Tank Battalion
Hattin, Salah al-Din & Hanin reconnaissance battalions
Thirty artillery battalions
Iraqi Air Force
Iraqi Army Air Corps

References

The Iran–Iraq War 1980-1988; Karsh, Efraim; Osprey Publishing; 2002
http://www.aja.ir/portal/Home/ShowPage.aspx?Object=News&CategoryID=31181e33-a5ba-4aa4-96ac-d4af5d174bc2&WebPartID=44f1e8b7-bb76-4037-9172-315858616c2c&ID=0225efab-94ae-4f01-aed5-2e6a3c09c197

Jerusalem
History of Khuzestan Province